Alexander Jeremiah Orenstein (26 September 1879 – 7 July 1972) was a Russian-born naturalized American general and military doctor.

Orenstein worked in the Panama Canal Zone and South Africa, on the eradication and treatment of tropical disease, and founded a series of lectures which bears his name.

Life
Alexander Jeremiah Orenstein was born in Odessa, Kherson Governorate, Russian Empire in 1879 to Joseph Orenstein and his wife Mary (née Jarkowsky). He became a naturalized US citizen in 1905, and two years later he married Marie G. Sabsevich in New York.

In the years 1905-12 Orenstein worked with General Gorgas in the Panama Canal Zone, where he assisted in the eradication of malaria and yellow fever during the building of the Panama Canal. In 1913 he was invited by Gorgas to work in German East Africa, and the next year, also with Gorgas, he worked in Johannesburg for Rand Mines Ltd. to reduce the high incidence of pneumonia and tuberculosis among miners. He lived in a house near the University of the Witwatersrand now known as the Villa d'Este. He remained in South Africa until his death. During both world wars Orenstein was director general of medical services in the South African defence forces, becoming first a Brigadier, then a Major General.

AJ Orenstein Memorial Lectures
In 1962, Orenstein delivered the first of a series of annual lectures at the inception of the Adler Museum of Medicine of the University of the Witwatersrand. There were AJ Orenstein Lectures from 1967 to 1971. In 1972, after Orenstein's death, the name was changed to the AJ Orenstein Memorial Lecture, to commemorate his work for the health service of the mining industry, and lectures have since been held nearly every year on a wide range of subjects included under health care.

Awards
 MD
 DSc Phila (1905)
 MRCS LRCP (1916)
 LLD Wits (1931)
 MD Jefferson (1920)
 MRCP (1938)
 FRCP (1946)
 Hon FRSM
 Hon FRSTMH
 
  Order St-Michael St-George
 
  British War Medal
  Victory Medal (South Africa)

References

Bibliography
 A. P. Cartwright, Golden Age, Purnell (1968)
 A. P. Cartwright, South Africa's Hall of Fame, Central News Agency (1958)

External links
 Royal College of Physicians: Lives of the Fellows
 S2A3 Biographical Database of South African Science
 Adler Museum of Medicine at Witwatersrand University

1879 births
1972 deaths
United States Army generals
South African Army generals
American public health doctors
Emigrants from the Russian Empire to the United States